Koppel or Kopel is surname, and may refer to:
 Anders Koppel (born 1947), Danish classical and popular composer and pianist
 Andrea Koppel (born 1963), American political and Chinese topical journalist
 Annisette Koppel (born 1948), Danish singer
 Bernie Kopell (born 1933), American character actor
 Dave Kopel (born 1960), American author, attorney, and gun rights advocate
 Gavin Koppel (stage name DJ Lyfe), American musician and graffiti artist
 Heinrich Koppel (1863–1944), Estonian medical scientist and rector
 Heinz Koppel (1919–1980), British artist
 Herman David Koppel (1908–1998), Danish classical music composer and pianist
 Lone Koppel (born 1938), Danish singer
 Martin Koppel, American leader of the Socialist Workers Party in the United States
 Naja Rosa Koppel (born 1980), Danish singer and songwriter
 Nancy Kopell (born 1942), American mathematician
 Nikolaj Koppel (born 1969), Danish pianist, music director and journalist
 Oliver Koppell (born 1940), American politician
 Ted Koppel (born 1940), American political journalist
 Thomas Koppel (1944–2006), Danish classical music composer and musician
 Virve Koppel (1931–2016), Estonian television and film director

Surnames
Danish-language surnames
Estonian-language surnames